is a Japanese former footballer who last played as a goalkeeper for Vanraure Hachinohe.

Career
Yamada retired from playing at the end of the 2019 season to become Vanraure Hachinohe's goalkeeping coach.

Career statistics

Club
.

Notes

References

External links

1989 births
Living people
People from Obihiro, Hokkaido
Association football people from Hokkaido
Sportspeople from Hokkaido
Kokushikan University alumni
Japanese footballers
Association football goalkeepers
Japan Football League players
J3 League players
Vanraure Hachinohe players